The 2009 Singapore Open Super Series was the fifth tournament of 2009 BWF Super Series badminton tournament. It was held from June 9 to June 14, 2009 in Singapore.

Men's singles

Seeds

 Lee Chong Wei
 Peter Gade
 Sony Dwi Kuncoro
 Chen Jin
 Joachim Persson
 Simon Santoso
 Przemysław Wacha
 Chan Yan Kit

Results

Women's singles

Seeds

 Zhou Mi
 Wang Yihan
 Wang Lin
 Wang Chen
 Pi Hongyan
 Saina Nehwal
 Lu Lan
 Xie Xingfang

Results

Men's doubles

Seeds

 Markis Kido / Hendra Setiawan 
 Mathias Boe / Carsten Mogensen
 Koo Kien Keat / Tan Boon Heong
 Lars Paaske / Jonas Rasmussen
 Cai Yun / Fu Haifeng
 Jung Jae-sung / Lee Yong-dae
 Mohammad Ahsan / Bona Septano
 Choong Tan Fook / Lee Wan Wah

Results

Women's doubles

Seeds

 Chin Eei Hui / Wong Pei Tty
 Cheng Shu / Zhao Yunlei 
 Ha Jung-eun / Kim Min-jung
 Lee Hyo-jung / Lee Kyung-won
 Zhang Yawen / Zhao Tingting
 Miyuki Maeda / Satoko Suetsuna
 Shendy Puspa Irawati / Meiliana Jauhari
 Lena Frier Kristiansen / Kamilla Rytter Juhl

Results

Mixed doubles

Seeds

 Nova Widianto / Liliyana Natsir
 Lee Yong-dae / Lee Hyo-jung
 Thomas Laybourn / Kamilla Rytter Juhl
 Joachim Fischer Nielsen / Christinna Pedersen
 Zheng Bo / Ma Jin
 Xie Zhongbo / Zhang Yawen
 Xu Chen / Zhao Yunlei
 Sudket Prapakamol / Saralee Thungthongkam

Results

Notes

External links
Singapore Super Series 2009 at tournamentsoftware.com

Singapore Open (badminton)
Open Super Series
Singapore